The decade of the 1440s in art involved some significant events.

Events
 1440: Donatello completes his series of sculptures for Prato Cathedral.
 1440: Pisanello moves to Milan.
 1440: Luca della Robbia invents new techniques in terra cotta sculpting at about this date.
 1440: Rogier van der Weyden begins his travels through the Italian city-states.
 1445: Fra Angelico is summoned by the Pope to paint frescoes in the Chapel of the Holy Sacrament (destroyed) in St. Peter's Basilica. 
 1445: Piero della Francesca is commissioned by the Compagnia della Misericordia in Sansepolcro to paint the Madonna della Misericordia.
 1448: Giovanni d'Alemagna the elder, Antonio Vivarini, Niccolò Pizzolo and Andrea Mantegna are commissioned to decorate the Ovetari Chapel of the Church of the Eremitani in Padua.

Paintings

Anonymous – The Triumph of Death (c.1446) (Palazzo Abatellis, Palermo)
Fra Angelico – Frescoes in San Marco, Florence, notably the Crucifixion in the Capitular Hall (completed 1442), and the San Marco Altarpiece (completed c.1443)
Fra Angelico and assistants – Frescoes in Niccoline Chapel of the Apostolic Palace in the Vatican City (1447-1451)
Hans Bornemann – Heiligentaler Altar (Altarpiece of St. Nicholas) (after 1444)
Dieric Bouts – Infancy Triptych (c.1445) (Museo del Prado)
Petrus Christus
Lamentation (Pietà) (c.1444)
Portrait of a Carthusian (1446)
Niccolò Antonio Colantonio – Delivery of the Franciscan Rule (c.1445)
Lluís Dalmau
Virgin and Child (1445)
Virgin of the Consellers (1443-1445)
Andrea del Castagno – Frescoes
Death of the Virgin (1442–1443) (St Mark's Basilica, Venice)
San Tarasio Chapel, San Zaccaria, Venice (1442)
The Last Supper (1445-1450) and others (Sant'Apollonia, Florence)
Piero della Francesca
The Baptism of Christ (completed c.1448-1450)
Frescoes in Castello Estense and church of Sant'Andrea, Ferrara (1449; now lost)
Barthélemy d'Eyck (attributed) – Aix Annunciation (1443-1445)
Giovanni di Paolo
Guelfi Altarpiece (1445)
Illuminations of Dante's Paradiso (c.1444-1450)
Jean Fouquet – Portrait of Pope Eugene IV (before 1447)
Jost Haller − Tempelhof Altarpiece (ca. 1445)
Filippo Lippi
Annunciation (completed c.1443-1450) (Alte Pinakothek, Munich)
Annunciation (completed c.1445-1450) (Doria Pamphilj Gallery, Rome)
The Annunciation with two Kneeling Donors (1440-1445)
Coronation of the Virgin (1441-1447)
Marsuppini Coronation (after 1444)
Martelli Annunciation (c.1440)
Andrea Mantegna – Saint Jerome in the Wilderness (c.1448–1451) (São Paulo Museum of Art)
Pisanello
Portrait of a Princess of the House of Este (c.1435-1449)
Cecilia Gonzaga commemorative medal (1447)
Stefano di Giovanni (Sassetta) – The Meeting of St. Anthony and St. Paul (c.1440)
Tenshō Shūbun  – Reading in a Bamboo Grove
Paolo Uccello
The Battle of San Romano (triptych, c.1435-1455)
Green Stations of the Cross frescoes in Chiostro Verde (green cloisters) of Basilica of Santa Maria Novella, Florence (1446-1447)
Nativity and Resurrection stained glass windows (1443-1444) and Four Evangelists clock face in Florence Cathedral
Rogier van der Weyden
The Descent from the Cross (c.1435)
The Exhumation of Saint Hubert (c.1437-1440)
Beaune Altarpiece (c.1445-1450)
Miraflores Altarpiece (c.1442-1445)
Portrait of Isabella of Portugal (c.1445-1450)
Saint Luke Drawing the Virgin ("Self-portrait as Saint Luke") (c.1435-1440) (Museum of Fine Arts, Boston)
Seven Sacraments Altarpiece (1445-1450)
Frontispiece of the Chroniques de Hainaut (1447)
Jan van Eyck
Annunciation (c.1440)
Portrait of Christ ("Vera Icon") (c.1440) (Groeningemuseum)
Saint Jerome in His Study (1442)
Domenico Veneziano
The Carnesecchi Tabernacle (c.1440-1444) (surviving fragments in National Gallery, London)
Santa Lucia de' Magnoli Altarpiece (c.1445-1447)
Konrad Witz
Altarpiece of the Virgin (c.1440)
Saint Madeleine and Saint Catherine (c. 1440)
The Miraculous Draft of Fishes (1444)

Births
 1440: Jacopo de' Barbari – Italian painter and printmaker (died 1516)
 1440: Agnolo degli Erri -  Italian Gothic painter of the Italian Renaissance (died 1482)
 1440: Antonio Vivarini – Italian painter of the Vivarini family of painters (died 1480)
 1440: Adriano Fiorentino -  Italian medallist and sculptor (died 1499)
 1440: Giovanni Dalmata – Dalmatian sculptor (died 1514)
 1440: Andrea di Niccolò - Italian painter of the Sienese School (died 1514)
 1440: Dionisius – head of the Moscow school of icon painters (died 1502)
 1440: Rueland Frueauf the Elder - Austrian Late-Gothic painter (died 1507)
 1440: Cristoforo de Predis – Italian miniaturist and illuminator (died 1486)
 1440: Fiorenzo di Lorenzo – Italian painter of the Umbrian school (died 1522)
 1440: Ludwig Schongauer – German painter (d. ca.1494)
 1440: Hugo van der Goes – Flemish painter (died 1482)
 1440: Bartolomé Bermejo – Spanish painter who adopted Dutch painting techniques (died 1498)
 1440: Fra Girolamo Bonsignori – Italian monk and painter (died 1519)
 1440: Vittorio Crivelli – Italian painter (died 1501/1502)
 1440: Fernando Gallego – Spanish painter brought up in an age of gothic style (died 1507)
 1440: Rodrigo de Osona - Spanish Renaissance painter (died 1518)
 (born 1440–1445): Colijn de Coter – early Netherlandish painter who produced mainly altarpieces (died 1522-1532)
 c.1440s: Master I. A. M. of Zwolle, anonymous Dutch goldsmith and engraver (died 1504)
 c.1440s: Gil de Siloé, Spanish Gothic sculptor of Flemish origin (died 1501)
 1441: Liberale da Verona – Italian painter of the Renaissance period active mainly in Verona (died 1526)
 1441: Ali-Shir Nava'i – Central Asian politician, mystic, linguist, painter, and poet (died 1501)
 1442: Benedetto da Maiano – sculptor (died 1497)
 1442: Jacopo da Sellaio – Italian painter from the Florentine School (died 1493)
 1442: Domenico Morone – Italian painter from Verona (died 1518)
 1443: Giuliano da Sangallo - Italian sculptor and architect (died 1518)
 1443: Piero del Pollaiuolo – painter (died 1496)
 1443: Baldassare Estense – Italian painter and medalist (died unknown)
 1443: Giovanni di Stefano, Italian bronze-caster, engineer, and sculptor (died 1506)
 1445: Gian Giacomo Dolcebuono - Italian architect and sculptor (died 1504)
 1445: Francesco Rosselli –  Italian miniature painter, engraver of maps and old master prints (died 1513)
 1445: Sandro Botticelli – Italian painter of the Florentine school during the Early Renaissance (Quattrocento) (died 1510)
 1445: Ambrogio Foppa – Italian goldsmith, sculptor, and die sinker (died 1527)
 1445: Guido Mazzoni – Italian sculptor and painter (died 1518)
 1445: Luca Signorelli – Italian Renaissance painter, draughtsman, especially in his use of foreshortening (died 1523)
 1445: Israhel van Meckenem – German printmaker and goldsmith (died 1503)
 1445/1450: Veit Stoss – Engraver, painter, and sculptor of the late Gothic sculpture in Germany (died 1533)
 1446: Antonio del Rincón – Spanish painter and artist (died 1500)
 1446: Biagio d'Antonio - Italian painter (died 1516)
 1446: Alvise Vivarini – Italian painter (died 1502)
 1446/1450: Pietro Perugino – Italian painter of the Umbrian school during the High Renaissance (died 1523)
 1447: Neroccio di Bartolomeo de' Landi – Italian painter and sculptor (died 1500)
 1447: Bartolomeo degli Erri -  Italian Gothic painter of the Italian Renaissance (died 1482)
 1447: Giovanni Antonio Amadeo – Italian early Renaissance sculptor[1], architect and engineer (died 1522)
 1448: Martin Schongauer – German engraver and painter (died 1491)
 1448: Dieric Bouts the Younger - Belgian painter of the Early Netherlandish painting era (died 1491)
 1449: Lazzaro Bastiani – Italian painter of the Renaissance, active mainly in Venice (died 1512)
 1449: Domenico Ghirlandaio – painter (died 1494)
 1449: Domenico Gagini – Italian sculptor (died 1492)

Deaths
 1440: Cennino D'Andrea Cennini – Florentine painter (born 1370)
 1441: Bartolomeo di Fruosino -  Italian painter and illuminator of the Florentine School (born 1366 or 1369)
 1441: Jan van Eyck – Early Netherlandish painter (born 1385)
 1444: Robert Campin – Early Netherlandish painter (born 1375)
 1444: Guo Chun – imperial Chinese painter in the early Ming Dynasty (born 1370)
 1444: Ottaviano Nelli - Italian quattrocento painter (born 1375)
 1445: Henri Bellechose – painter from the South Netherlands (b. unknown)
 1445: Michelino Molinari da Besozzo – Italian painter (born 1385)
 1445/1446: Konrad Witz – German painter, especially of altarpieces (born 1400-1410)
 1446/1447: Mir Ali Tabrizi – Persian calligrapher and inventor of the Nastaʿlīq script (born unknown)
 1447: Masolino da Panicale – Italian painter (born 1383)

 
Art
Years of the 15th century in art